Sexo, amor y otras perversiones (Spanish for "Sex, love and other perversions") is a 2006 Mexican film  made up of eight short films directed by the renowned Mexican film directors:

 Carlos Carrera (segment "Barbacoa de Chivo")
 Daniel Gruener
 Gustavo Loza
 Carolina Rivera
 María Fernanda Suárez
 Gerardo Tort
 Ángel Flores Torres (segment "Recompensa")
 Javier 'Fox' Patrón  (segment "El Auto")
 Carlos Sariñana   (segment "A una Mujer Decente")

Cast
 Tiaré Scanda as Mayán
 Claudia Ramírez as a blond woman
 Ana Serradilla as Mirtha (segment "Por Amor")
 Carlos Torres Torrija as Lucio
 Fernando Carrillo as Rodrigo
 Patricia Llaca as Elena
 Martha Higareda as María
 Arcelia Ramírez

Plot
Tagline: "Which one is your depravation?"

Eight stories ranging from the story of a woman who awakes at an unknown person's apartment to the rejoining of two underground lovers. From the warm flirtings of two women to a girl captive in an elevator. Other stories are tied among these: a female teacher who is flirted by one of her students; a teenager's deception that joins again with her best friend from secondary school: the adventure of two porn actors who find love, and the amusing plans of a single man who just wishes to be kind with his old mother...

From the producer and director of Todo el poder, and Cero y van cuatro, Fernando Sariñana.

External links 
 

2006 films
2000s Spanish-language films
2006 comedy-drama films
Mexican anthology films
Films about pornography
Films directed by Carlos Carrera
2006 comedy films
2006 drama films
Mexican comedy-drama films
2000s Mexican films